The Women's keirin competition at the 2021 UCI Track Cycling World Championships was held on 24 October 2021.

Results

First round
The first round was started at 13:08. The first two riders from each heat qualified for the second round, all other riders moved to the repechages.

Heat 1

Heat 3

Heat 2

Heat 4

First round repechage
The first round repechage was started at 13:34. The first rider from each heat qualified for the second round.

Heat 1

Heat 3

Heat 2

Heat 4

Second round
The second round was started at 14:35. The first three riders in each heat qualified for the final, all other riders raced for places 7 to 12.

Heat 1

Heat 2

Finals
The finals were started at 16:23.

Small final

Final

References

Women's keirin